Rise of the Great Wall is a 1986 Hong Kong television series based on the life of Qin Shi Huang, the First Emperor of China and founder of the Qin dynasty. The series is one of the biggest productions by ATV.

Plot
The series follows the life of Ying Zheng, the ruler of the Qin state in the Warring States period, who eventually unified China, established the Qin dynasty, and became the First Emperor of a unified China. The series also includes a subplot about Jing Ke, an assassin who attempted to take the emperor's life.

Cast
 Note: Some of the characters' names are in Cantonese romanisation.

Qin state

Yan state

Zhao state

Others

Production notes
Rise of the Great Wall set a new standard for ATV because most of its prior television series were not as good as those produced by its rival, TVB.

See also
 Qin Shi Huang (2001 TV series)
 The Emperor's Shadow
 The Emperor and the Assassin
 Hero (2002 film)

References

Asia Television original programming
1985 Hong Kong television series debuts
Television series set in the Qin dynasty
1980s Hong Kong television series
Cantonese-language television shows
Cultural depictions of Qin Shi Huang
Television shows set in Xi'an